Vaddante Dabbu is a 1954 Indian Telugu-language screwball comedy film directed by Y. R. Swamy. It was produced by Moola Narayana Swamy and presented by H. M. Reddy on Rohini Pictures banner. The film stars N. T. Rama Rao, Sowcar Janaki and Jamuna, with music composed by T. A. Kalyanam. It is based on the George Barr McCutcheon novel Brewster's Millions (1902). Despite originally opening to a mixed response, it attained cult status in Telugu cinema, and was remade in the same language as Babai Abbai (1985).

Plot 
Syam and Rama Rao are close friends and start living together, their lifestyle is to make debts for their survival and escape from lenders. Syam is an artist, Saroja, the daughter of a multimillionaire Rao Saheb Hemachalapathi is an admirer of his paintings, she meets him to draw her portrait and both of them fall in love. Hemachalapathi assigns a task for Syam by giving a huge amount of ₹1 lakh and asks him to spend it within the timeline of 30 days and also keeps some conditions that he should not donate or destroy the money. Syam starts spending the money with the help of Rama Rao's ideas such as racing, gambling, making a drama, constructing a house, etc. But their income grows day by day and Syam gets fed up with this money. Finally, he gives all the money back to Hemachalapathi, at that time Hemachalapathi explains to him that he has kept this task to study Syam's character and he should also understand how dangerous the money is and the film ends with the marriage of Syam and Saroja.

Cast 
N. T. Rama Rao as Syam
Sowcar Janaki as Saroja
Jamuna as Rekha
Rajanala as Rao Saheb Hemachalapathi
Peketi Sivaram as Rama Rao
Allu Ramalingaiah as Master Baddanki
Hemalatha as Yashoda

Production 
Vaddante Dabbu was adapted from George Barr McCutcheon's English-language novel Brewster's Millions (1902), and was among the earliest screwball comedies of Telugu cinema.

Music 
Music was composed by T. A. Kalyanam. Lyrics were written by Devulapalli, Vempati Sadasivabrahmam, and Sri Sri.

Release and reception 
Vaddante Dabbu was released on 19 February 1954. Despite originally opening to a mixed response, it attained cult status in Telugu cinema, and was remade in the same language as Babai Abbai (1985).

References

External links 
 

1950s screwball comedy films
1950s Telugu-language films
1954 comedy films
1954 films
Films based on Brewster's Millions
Indian black-and-white films
Indian screwball comedy films